Moglia is a comune (municipality) in the Province of Mantua in the Italian region Lombardy, located about  southeast of Milan and about  southeast of Mantua.

References

External links
 Official website

Cities and towns in Lombardy